Jussi Veikkanen (born 29 March 1981) is a Finnish former road racing cyclist, who rode as a professional between 2005 and 2015 for the  and  teams. He won the Finnish National Road Race Championships seven times between 2003 and 2014.

Career

After a long breakaway on stage 2 of the 2009 Tour de France he donned the polka-dot jersey as the leader of the mountains classification. He kept the jersey until stage 6, when Stéphane Augé took it.

Major results

2002
 National Road Championships
2nd Road race
2nd Time trial
2003
 1st  Road race, National Road Championships
 2nd Overall Circuit des Ardennes
2004
 1st Grand Prix des Marbriers
 2nd Overall Ruban Granitier Breton
 National Road Championships
3rd Road race
3rd Time trial
 4th Paris–Troyes
2005
 1st  Road race, National Road Championships
 5th Grand Prix of Aargau Canton
2006
 National Road Championships
1st  Road race
3rd Time trial
 1st Overall La Tropicale Amissa Bongo
1st Stage 1
 3rd Overall Tour du Poitou-Charentes
1st Stage 2
 8th Overall Volta ao Distrito de Santarém
2007
 3rd Overall La Tropicale Amissa Bongo Ondimbo
 8th Overall Tour Méditerranéen
2008
 National Road Championships
1st  Road race
2nd Time trial
 1st Stage 4 Route du Sud
 4th Overall Tour de l'Ain
 5th Overall Tour de Wallonie
 10th Overall Deutschland Tour
1st Stage 6
2009
 2nd Overall Tour Méditerranéen
 3rd Overall Tour du Haut Var
 9th Overall Tour Down Under
 9th Grand Prix d'Isbergues
 Tour de France
Held  after Stages 2–5
2010
 1st  Road race, National Road Championships
 6th Overall Tour Méditerranéen
1st Stage 2
2013
 1st  Road race, National Road Championships
 10th Overall Tour Down Under
2014
 1st  Road race, National Road Championships
2015
 National Road Championships
2nd Road race
3rd Time trial

Grand Tour general classification results timeline

References

External links

 

1981 births
Living people
People from Riihimäki
Finnish male cyclists
Cyclists at the 2012 Summer Olympics
Olympic cyclists of Finland
Sportspeople from Kanta-Häme